Lambom Island is an island off the south-western corner of New Ireland, Papua New Guinea, off Lambom. On the other side of the Cape St. George peninsula is Lanisso Bay.

References

Islands of Papua New Guinea
New Ireland Province